The Golden Horse Award for Best Cinematography is given at the Golden Horse Film Awards, a film festival and awards ceremony held annually in Taiwan. From the 1st Golden Horse Awards in 1962 to the 14th Golden Horse Awards in 1977, this award was called the Golden Horse Award for Best Color Cinematography. During that time, a Golden Horse Award for Best Black and White Cinematography was also awarded 5 times.

Superlatives  

Since 1990, the following cinematographers have received two or more Best Cinematography awards:

Winners and nominees 

Note: Original titles are in traditional Chinese.

1990s

2000s

2010s

External links 
 Official website 
 Official website 

Golden Horse Film Awards
Awards for best cinematography